The 2002 Commonwealth Heads of Government Meeting was the 17th Meeting of the Heads of Government of the Commonwealth of Nations. It was held in Coolum, Queensland, Australia, between 2 and 5 March 2002, and hosted by the Prime Minister of Australia, John Howard.

Planned to have been hosted in Brisbane on 6 October 2001, the CHOGM was postponed only nine days before it was due to be held, on account of the 11 September terrorist attacks on the United States. When the meeting was finally held, three issues loomed large on the agenda: security, the future of the Commonwealth, and (most prominently) Zimbabwe's upcoming presidential election.

The meeting was attended by representatives of 51 countries out of the Commonwealth's 54 members (suspended member Pakistan was not invited, whilst Antigua and Barbuda and Grenada sent no representatives). Of those, 35 were represented by their head of state or head of government.

Security
Originally slated to be hosted in Canberra, Australian Capital Territory the plan was changed so it would be held in Brisbane on 6 October 2001, making it two years since the previous meeting. However, on 28 September, in the wake of the 11 September terrorist attacks, it was postponed, to allow for improved security. Instead of the October summit, the Heads of Government issued a statement on terrorism and established the Commonwealth Committee on Terrorism, which met on 29 January 2002, reported in March, and recommended annual reviews of the Commonwealth's counter-terrorism strategy.

The postponement dealt a big blow to the Commonwealth, both in piling up costs on an already over-stretched budget and undermining the celebration and promotion of Commonwealth culture and values to Australia that the Heads of Government had hoped the CHOGM would be. The postponement ultimately raised questions of how credible and practical the CHOGM, and thus the present Commonwealth, could be. However, the civil society celebration went on as planned, except without the Heads of Government and media presence, and were deemed to be a great success, despite the surreal circumstances.

The CHOGM itself was highly security-conscious, due to the concerns raised by the attacks. The hotel compound was ringed by an electric fence, whilst the media representatives were transported by coach between venues. Security, originally budgeted at A$11.4m, was ramped up to include 4,000 Queensland Police, 2,000 Australian Defence Force, and over 100 Federal Police personnel. This, combined with the presence of only 30 accredited NGO representatives, gave the entire CHOGM the feel of a 'retreat without a retreat', rather than accessible conference.

Zimbabwe
At the CHOGM, the Commonwealth made final arrangements for its election observer mission to Zimbabwe, which would consist of 42 observers and 19 staff from 26 countries. With the earlier withdrawal of the European Union's observers, the Commonwealth's delegation was to be the only fully international group judging the election's fairness. The CHOGM gave the 'troika' of Chairperson-in-Office John Howard, Thabo Mbeki, and Olusegun Obasanjo a mandate to assess whether the report of the observers met the Harare Declaration, and (if it didn't) the punishment under the Millbrook Programme. The observers' initial report was received by the troika on 14 March, and explicitly stated that 'conditions in Zimbabwe did not adequately allow for free expression of will by the electors'. In response, the troika, announced on 19 March 2002 that Zimbabwe was to be suspended from the Commonwealth immediately.

Two other countries that had been suspended were deemed to have shown progress. Fiji's suspension had been lifted by the Commonwealth Ministerial Action Group (CMAG) on 20 December 2001, allowing Fiji to take part in the CHOGM. Nevertheless, it would stay on the CMAG's agenda until Laisenia Qarase's government had been ruled constitutional by the Supreme Court. Even though Pakistan's suspension was not lifted in time for the CHOGM, the CMAG meeting on 30 January accepted Pervez Musharraf's plans for the elections in October, and recommended that the Commonwealth should send observers, with a view to lifting the suspension if the election was free of fraud or intimidation.

Footnotes

External links
 Commonwealth Secretariat webpage on CHOGM 2002

2002
2002 in Australia
History of Queensland
Diplomatic conferences in Australia
21st-century diplomatic conferences (Commonwealth)
2002 in international relations
Australia and the Commonwealth of Nations
Royal visits to Australia
2002 conferences
2000s in Queensland
March 2002 events in Australia